Littlehampton is a village in the Adelaide Hills of South Australia, located on the Old Princes Highway. It is approximately 35 minutes from the Adelaide CBD via the South Eastern Freeway. 

At the time of the 2016 Australian census, Littlehampton had a population of 3,522. 

Littlehampton was laid out in 1849 by Benjamin Gray, who named it after his native town in Sussex. 

By 1890, the village had become a busy industrial centre with a sawmill, brewery and various manufacturers producing jams, sauces, bacon, wattle extract. There were five brick works.    

Littlehampton Bricks, which continues to operate today, was established in 1913, developing from another brickyard–Coppins–on the opposite side of the main road into Littlehampton.    

The 1862 church on Main Street—North Tce and now Princes Hwy—was one of the oldest active Churches in South Australia until 2020. This United Church ceased services due to the COVID-19 pandemic.

Subterranean Clover 
The first commercial collection in the world of any pasture legume seed was done by Amos Howard about two kilometres east of Littlehampton.  This was of Trifolium subterraneum (Subterranean Clover). This cultivar was later named 'Mount Barker' and is still commercially available.

Fire service
The Littlehampton Country Fire Service (CFS) is the volunteer fire service of Littlehampton.  They are part of the Heysen group.

References

External links
 Tourist Information on Littlehampton
 Littlehampton webpage
 Littlehampton Country Fire Service
 http://www.littlehamptonbrick.com.au/

1836 establishments in Australia